Mark F. Squilla is a Democratic politician and member of the City Council of Philadelphia, Pennsylvania.

Political career
Squilla is active in Philadelphia Democratic politics, having held a variety of positions. In the 2004 Democratic primary, he unsuccessfully challenged incumbent State Representative William Keller for a seat in the State House. In 2011, he ran for City Council, seeking to succeed retiring Democrat Frank DiCicco in the First District. He ultimately came out on-top of a four-man Democratic primary field, and faced no opposition in the general election.

Personal life
Squilla's wife, Brigid, is a nurse anesthetist. The couple has four children.

See also
List of members of Philadelphia City Council since 1952

References

External links
Councilman Mark Squilla official city website

Year of birth missing (living people)
Living people
Philadelphia City Council members
Pennsylvania Democrats